The 2008 West Oxfordshire District Council election took place on 1 May 2008 to elect members of West Oxfordshire District Council in Oxfordshire, England. One third of the council was up for election and the Conservative Party stayed in overall control of the council.

After the election, the composition of the council was:
Conservative 40
Liberal Democrats 6
Independent 2
Labour 1

Background
Before the election the Conservatives controlled the council with 36 councillors, compared to eight for the Liberal Democrats, four Independents and one Labour councillor. 17 of the 49 seats on the council were up for election in 2008, which meant the Conservatives were guaranteed to keep a majority.

The Conservative leader of the council, Barry Norton, in North Leigh ward was one of four Conservatives who were elected without opposition, with the Conservatives being the only party to have a full 17 candidates. Both the Liberal Democrats and Green Party had eight candidates, Labour had five candidates, UK Independence Party two and there were two independents.

13 councillors sought re-election, with the councillors who stood down at the election including the Conservative former council chairman Tony Walker from Kingham, Rollright and Enstone ward, the Liberal Democrat group leader Stuart Brooks of Freeland and Hanborough ward, and Independent Derrick Millard of Stonesfield and Tackley ward.

Election result
The Conservatives gained four seats to win 11 of the 13 seats contested. This took the Conservatives to 40 of the 49 councillors and reduced the opposition to its lowest level on the council as of 2008. Conservative gains included taking Witney South from independent, former Witney mayor, Peter Green, while Conservative Ian Hudspeth held Woodstock and Bladon by 45 votes.

The Liberal Democrats lost two seats to be reduced to four councillors, although Margaret Stevens narrowly held Eynsham and Cassington for the party by four votes. Meanwhile, the number of independents was reduced by two to two councillors, while Labour remained with one councillor. Overall 11 of the 13 councillors who stood were re-elected with average turnout at the election being 39.84%.

Ward results

References

2008 English local elections
2008
2000s in Oxfordshire